William Oktavec (born Wenceslaus Anton Oktavec Sr.) was a Bohemian-born American artist, draftsman, butcher, and grocer in Baltimore, best known for inventing screen painting.

Personal life
Oktavec was born in Kasejovice in Austrian Bohemia on October 25th, 1884. He was the fifth of eight siblings. His father owned a small farm in Kasejovice. Emigrating from Bremen, Germany to New York City in 1901, Oktavec resided in Baltimore by 1912. Oktavec visited Kasejovice in 1938, which was the last time he ever saw his European family members.

Career
While living in East Baltimore's Little Bohemia, Oktavec owned a grocery store. Originally a house, Oktavec refashioned into a grocery. The store was located at 847 North Collington Avenue at the intersection with Ashland Avenue, adjacent to the Bohemian parish of St. Wenceslaus Catholic Church. Oktavev's grocery store only lasted for 2 years. While trained as a butcher, he was also an artist. During the summer of 1913, Oktavec noticed that his produce was wilting due to the heat of the Sun. Moving the fruit and vegetables inside his store, he painted the screens on his store to look like they were display cases showing fresh produce and meats. The novelty of the painted screens attracted the attention of customers. Another benefit of painted screens was that they allowed people to look outside without allowing people to look inside. Oktavev's neighbor Emma Schott requested a screen painting for her own home, using a photograph that reminded her of her rural upbringing in Bohemia. Screen painting quickly became popular with Baltimore's working-class Czech immigrant community, and soon became common across the city. A common motif was a red-roofed bungalow with two swans in a pond.

In 1922, Oktavev opened the Art Store on East Monument Street to pursue his career as an artist. Oktavev's children, grandchildren, and many students helped popularize the art form.

Some of Oktavec's painted screens are owned by the Maryland Historical Society.

Death and legacy
William Oktavec died on June 2nd, 1956. he is buried at Most Holy Redeemer Cemetery in East Baltimore. His son, Albert Oktavec, also pursued a career as an artist and screen painter.

In 2013, a plaque was installed outside of the house at 847 North Collington Avenue to honor Oktavec. It was installed for the centennial of the invention of screen-painting by the Painted Screens Society of Baltimore and Skyline Property Management Titled "Screen Painting started here in 1913", the writing on the plaque reads:

References

External links

1884 births
1956 deaths
American artists
American butchers
American draughtsmen
American grocers
American people of Bohemian descent
Austro-Hungarian emigrants to the United States
Burials at Most Holy Redeemer Cemetery (Baltimore)
People from Baltimore